WAY-166818 is a synthetic, nonsteroidal estrogen related to WAY-200070 which is used in scientific research. It acts as a highly selective full agonist of the ERβ, with 57- and 164-fold selectivity for the ERβ over the ERα in the rat and mouse, respectively. At the human ERβ and ERα, WAY-166818 has IC50 values of 29 nM and 1227 nM (25-fold difference), respectively. The compound has been verified to cross the blood-brain-barrier in rodents.

See also
 8β-VE2
 Diarylpropionitrile
 ERB-196
 FERb 033
 Menerba
 Prinaberel
 WAY-214156

References

Alcohols
Benzoxazoles
Phenols
Selective ERβ agonists
Synthetic estrogens